AeroCube-3 is a single-unit CubeSat which was built and is being operated by The Aerospace Corporation, at El Segundo, California. It is the third AeroCube picosatellite, following on from AeroCube-1, which was lost in a launch failure in 2006, and AeroCube-2 which was successfully launched in 2007 but failed immediately after launch. Compared to its predecessors it contains several improvements in its infrastructure, including a redesigned power system, replacing the older system which was responsible for the loss of AeroCube-2. Its development was funded by the United States Air Force Space and Missile Systems Center, at Los Angeles Air Force Base.

Picosatellite 
AeroCube-3 carried technology development experiments. The primary systems demonstrated were a two-axis solar tracker and an Earth tracker, which could be used in the guidance systems of future satellites. It also carried a  balloon used for tracking tests and to increase drag, increasing the satellite's rate of orbital decay after its mission was completed. AeroCube-3 incorporates a semi-spherical (8-panel) balloon that can serve also as a tracking aid. AeroCube-3 uses an inflation system similar to the one on AeroCube-2. The difference in orbit life (with and without a balloon) is estimated to be from 1–3 years (depending on atmosphere assumptions) without a balloon compared with 2–3 months with the balloon inflated. A VGA-resolution camera pointing in the direction of the balloon will photograph its state of inflation.

Mission 
The AeroCube-3 mission consists of two phases. Phase A occurs with the AeroCube-3 tethered to the Orion 38 motor that is the upper stage for the TacSat-3 Minotaur launch vehicle. During this phase, AeroCube-3 will measure its dynamics while on the end of a -long tether attached to a tumbling object (the upper stage). A VGA-resolution camera with a wide-angle field of view will attempt to photograph the upper stage on orbit. A tether reeling mechanism inside the picosatellite can close the distance by drawing in the tether (it operates by ground command). Phase B occurs when the tether is cut and AeroCube-3 becomes a freeflying CubeSat picosatellite. In this phase, permanent magnets and hysteresis material will align the satellite with Earth's magnetic field. In this configuration, a sensor suite will sweep Earth's surface and various experiments can be performed. AeroCube-3 will store sensor data until it passes over its ground station and the data is downloaded.

Launch 
It was successfully launched on an Orbital Sciences Corporation Minotaur I launch vehicle from Pad 0B at the Mid-Atlantic Regional Spaceport, at 23:55 UTC on 19 May 2009. It was a tertiary payload, with TacSat-3 as the primary payload and PharmaSat as the secondary. Two other CubeSats, HawkSat-1 and CP6, were also launched, and together the three satellites were known as the CubeSat Technology Demonstration mission. The three satellites are placed in a Poly-Picosatellite Orbital Deployer (P-POD), which is about the size of a large loaf of bread.

Deployement 
The standard deployment system for cubesats, the P-POD was developed by the Aerospace Engineering Department at California Polytechnic State University, San Luis Obispo. After the primary satellite has been released and a collision and contamination avoidance maneuver has been performed, each cubesat will be deployed separately from the P-POD into space.

The satellite reentered in the atmosphere of Earth on 6 January 2011.

See also 

 List of CubeSats

References

External links 
 

Spacecraft launched in 2009
CubeSats
Spacecraft launched by Minotaur rockets
Spacecraft which reentered in 2011